The Leader of the Opposition in the Madhya Pradesh Legislative Assembly is the politician who leads the official opposition in the Madhya Pradesh Legislative Assembly.

Leaders of Opposition 

On 28 April 2022 Kamal Nath has resigned as the Leader of Opposition in the Madhya Pradesh Assembly. 
All India Congress Committee (AICC) president Sonia Gandhi appointed former minister and senior party MLA from Lahar Govind Singh as Leader of Opposition

References 

 
Madhya Pradesh